Pinane is a set of isomeric terpenes.  Existing as chiral cis and trans isomers, they arise from the hydrogenation of pinene.  Both isomers undergo reaction with air to give 2-pinane hydroperoxides, also with chiral cis and trans isomers.  Partial reduction of these isomers gives 2-pinanol.

References

Monoterpenes
Cyclobutanes
Cyclohexanes